Yotvingians (also called: Sudovians, Jatvians, or Jatvingians; Yotvingian: Jotvingai; , ; ; ,) were a Western Baltic people who were closely tied to the Old Prussians. The linguist Petras Būtėnas asserts that they were closest to the Lithuanians. The Yotvingians contributed to the formation of the Lithuanian state.

Yotvingians had a strong warrior culture and were generally well known as great warriors and hunters, and were feared by their neighbours for their skill in warfare. The Yotvingians were referred to in regional historical records into the 19th century.

Culture

Etymology 
According to Vytautas Mažiulis, the name Sūduva derives from a local hydronym *Sūd(a)vā, in turn derived from a Baltic verbal root *sū-: to flow, pour.

A. S. Kibin proposed Yotvingian, or the "Slavic Jatviagi as the group name goes back to O. N. patronymic derivative játvingar meaning "the descendants of Játvígr", or "the people of Játvígr"" – "the name Játvígr mentioned by Knytlinga saga".

J. Pashka, acknowledging Kibin's proposal, has similarly interpreted the ethnonym as derived from the Old Norse Játvígr, with a genitive Játvígs liðsmenn (ᛃᚨᛏᚢᛁᚴᛋ ᚱᛟᚦᛋ) label of Játvígr's Viking expedition and his Norse Rus' settlers (i.e. Indura, Belarus) by the Nemunas river. Pashka asserts the nasal infixation in the original Old Norse Játvíg name of the 944-945 Kiev Treaty was probably an insignificant scribal error or misinterpretation, that has survived to the present.

Language 
Numerous linguists consider the Yotvingian language as a dialect of the Old Prussian language. The Lithuanian linguist Petras Būtėnas states that such an opinion is incorrect, because the Lithuanian  predominates in Yotvingian toponymy instead of the Old Prussian . The Lithuanian professor Zigmas Zinkevičius also wrote that the Yotvingians spoke a dialect of Western Baltic that was closer to Lithuanian than Prussian. The only known written source of the Yotvingian language is "" manuscript.

Geography 
The Yotvingian lived in the area of Sudovia (Yotvingia) and Dainava, southwest from the upper Nemunas. Today this area corresponds mostly to the Podlaskie Voivodeship in Poland, portions of Lithuania and a part of Hrodna Province in Belarus. The territory was between later the Marijampolė and Merkinė (Lithuania); Slonim and Kobryn (Belarus); and Białystok, and Lyck, in Prussia now Ełk (Poland).

History

Ancient history 
According to The Histories of Herodotus (5th century B.C.), the Neuri (Νευροί) were a tribe living beyond the Scythian cultivators, one of the nations along the course of the river Hypanis (Bug river), west of the Borysthenes (Dniepr river). This was roughly the area of modern Belarus and Eastern Poland by the Narew river, coinciding with the Yotvingian linguistic territory of toponyms and hydronyms (Narew river).

Ptolemy in the 2nd century AD called the people Galindai kai Soudinoi (Σουδινοί). Peter of Dusburg called them Galindite and Suduwite. In the Hypatian Codex the spellings are changing: Jatviagy, Jatviezie, Jatviažin, zemlia Jatveskaja, na zemliu Jatviažs´kuju and more. Polish sources also used Russian spellings: Jazviagi, Iazvizite, Jazvizite, Yazvizite. This name was taken by the papal administration: terra Jatwesouie, Gretuesia, Gzestuesie, Getuesia und Getvesia. The Knights called this tribe Sudowite, Sudowia, in qua Sudowit.

10th century 
In 944, during the treaty between the Kievan Rus' prince Igor and the emperor of the Byzantine Empire, the Yotvingians were hired by the Kievan ruler to serve as mercenaries. Also Vladimir I of Kiev, in 983, hired the Yotvingians to add to his army.

13th century 

In two dotations (1253 and 1259) of Mindaugas, a new name was recorded: Dainava, Deynowe, Dainowe, Denowe (land of songs). The forests were named Deinova Jatvež. In the treaty with the Teutonic Knights in 1260, the region is called "terre Getuizintarum". Skalmantas, leader of the Yotvingians was responsible for single-handedly raiding Pinsk in the Principality of Turov.

14th century 
In the sentence of Breslau of the emperor Sigismund of Luxembourg to the Livonian Order from 1325, this area is called Suderlandt alias Jetuen.

15th century 
Vytautas the Great wrote about "terra Sudorum", in a letter to King Sigismund of March 11, 1420.

A census by the clergy of the Belarus Grodno area in 1860 had as many as 30,929 inhabitants identifying as Yatviags.

Historical persons
Komantas of Sudovia led the Yotvingians in the Prussian uprisings.

See also
Sudovian language
Yotvingia

Literature 

Witczak, K. T., Traces of Dual Forms in Old Prussian and Jatvingian in Woljciech Smoczynski and Axel Holvoet, eds, Colloquium Pruthenicum primum, 1992, pp 93–98
Gerullis, G., Zur Sprache der Sudauer-Jadwinger, in Festschrift A. Bezzenberger, Göttingen 1927
Toporov,V., ИНДОЕВРОПЕЙСКЕ ЯЗЫКИ [Indo-European languages] Лингвистический энциклопеический словарь.[Linguistic encyclopedic dictionary] Moskva, 1990, pp 186–189
Mažiulis, V., Baltic languages. Britannica Online Encyclopedia
Henning, E., De rebus Jazygum sive Jazuin-gorum, Regiomonti, 1812
Sjoegren, A., Ueber die Wohnsitz Verhaeltnisse und der Jatwaeger, St. Petersburg, 1859
Sembrzycki, J., Die Nord-und Westgebiete the Jadwinger und deren Grenzen, Altpreussischeme Monatschrift, XXVIII, 1891, pp. 76–89
W. R. Schmalstieg, Studies in Old Prussian, University Park and London, 1976.
V. Toporov, Prusskij jazyk: Slovar''', A - L, Moskva, 1975–1990.
V. Mažiulis, Prūsų kalbos etimologijos žodynas, Vilnius, t. I-IV, 1988–1997.
 Archäologie der UDSSR: Die Finno-Ugrier und die Balten im Mittelalter, Teil II, Balten, S. 411–419, Moskau 1987
 Lepa, Gerhard (Hrsg): Die Sudauer, in Tolkemita-Texte Nr. 55, Dieburg 1998
 Lepa, Gerhard: Gedanken über die Prußen und ihre Lieder, in Tolkemita-Texte "25 Lieder der Sudauer" Nr. 56, Dieburg 1999
 Litauische Enzyklopädie, Bd. XXVX, Boston, USA, 1963
 Salemke, Gerhard: Lagepläne der Wallburganlagen von der ehemaligen Provinz Ostpreußen, Gütersloh, 2005, Karten 19/ 7 - 19/ 13
 Žilevičius, Juozas: Grundzüge der kleinlitauischen Volksmusik, in Tolkemita-Texte "25 Lieder der Sudauer" Nr. 56, Dieburg 1999

References

 Sources 

 
 
 
 
 
 
 
 
 DUSBURG (PETRI DE DUSBURG), Chronicon Prussiae'', ed. Chr. Hartknock, Jena, 1879

External links
M. Gimbutas book on the Balts, with maps

Historical ethnic groups of Europe
People from Prussia proper
Historical Baltic peoples